Fairview Farm is a historic home located near Front Royal, Warren County, Virginia. It was built during the last quarter of the 18th century, and is a two-story, nearly square, timber frame dwelling.  It has a hipped roof and two exterior chimneys.  It also has two-story porches rebuilt during the restoration in 1984.

The house is now owned by the Warren Heritage Society.

It was listed on the National Register of Historic Places in 1986.

References

External links
 Warren Heritage Society: Fairview

Houses on the National Register of Historic Places in Virginia
Houses in Warren County, Virginia
National Register of Historic Places in Warren County, Virginia